The Catholic Church in Greece is part of the worldwide Catholic Church, under the spiritual leadership of the Pope in Rome. Indigenous Catholic Greeks number about 50,000-70,000 and are a religious and not an ethnic minority. Most of them are a reminiscence of Venetian and Genoese rule in southern Greece and many Greek islands (in both the Aegean and Ionian seas) from the early 13th until the late 18th century, Greeks who converted to Catholicism or descendants of the thousands of Bavarians that came to Greece in the 1830s as soldiers and civil administrators, accompanying King Otto. One very old but still common term to reference to them is Φράγκοι, or "Franks", dating to the times of the Byzantine Empire, when medieval Greeks would use that term to describe all Catholics.

Since the early 1990s however, the number of Catholic permanent residents of Greece has greatly increased; as of 2002, they number 200,000 at the very least, and probably more. These Catholics are immigrants from Eastern Europe (especially Poland) or from the Philippines, but also include Western European expatriates that live permanently in Athens, Thessaloniki or the Greek islands (especially Crete, Syros, Rhodes and Corfu).

Today, the majority of Catholics live in Athens, a city of about four million people; the rest of them can be found all over Greece. Most indigenous Catholics live in the islands, and especially the Cyclades, where Syros and Tinos in particular have some entirely Catholic villages and parishes. Catholics can be found also in Corfu, Naxos, Santorini, Kefalonia, Zakynthos, Rhodes, Kos, Crete, Samos, Lesbos and Chios. In the mainland, Catholic communities are smaller, and include those of Patras (a city that was home to a large Italian community until World War II), Thessaloniki, Kavala, Volos etc. In addition to the Latin Church Catholics who represent the vast majority of the faithful, there are about 5,000 members of the Greek Byzantine Catholic Church and a few hundred Armenian Catholics.

History
Before the division of the church in 1054, there were structures of the Latin Church in Greece. Since the 5th century, the Latin Church archbishop of Thessalonica led the Illyrian Vicariate of the Latin Church. Until 1054, there was mutual recognition between the Latin and Byzantine communities in Greece.

After the separation of churches in 1054, a split occurred between these communities. After the church split and the conquest of Greece by the Ottoman Empire, the Greek Catholics began to be called "Franks" (Greek Φράγκοι). This name of local Catholics came from the Latin faith professed by the Franks. Orthodox Greeks, distinguishing themselves from the Franks, called themselves the "Romans" (Greek Ρωμαιοι), identifying themselves with the Byzantine Empire, which considered itself the successor to the Roman Empire.

After the Fourth Crusade in 1204, the residence of the Latin patriarch with 12 dioceses subordinate to him was established in Constantinople. In 1205, Pope Innocent III established the Latin Archdiocese in Athens. Other Latin church structures were established at the same time. In Greece, various Western monastic orders also operated.

After the conquest of Byzantium by the Ottoman Empire in 1453 in Greece, the activity of the Latin structures gradually ceased and the dioceses of the Latin rite became titular. At the same time, until the 18th century, there were numerous Venetian colonies in Greece, which possessed considerable freedom.

In 1830, a gradual restoration of Latin Church hierarchy began in Greece. That year, Pope Gregory XVI established the first Latin Church hierarchy, which was called the apostolic delegate. In 1834, Bishop Blancis was appointed apostolic delegate and the Holy See entrusted him with the care of Latin Catholics living in Greece. On July 23, 1875, Pope Pius IX established the archdiocese of Athens and the Peloponnese.

In 1856, a community of Greek Eastern Catholics was formed in Constantinople, which became the basis of the Greek Byzantine Catholic Church.

In 1979, the Holy See established diplomatic relations with Greece.

Popes from Greece

Pope Hyginus
Pope Eleutherius 
Pope Sixtus II

Bishops' Conference
The Bishops' Conference of Greece (Hiera Synodos Katholikis Hierarkhias Hellados) has six members:
The archbishop of Corfu and apostolic administrator of Thessaloniki
The archbishop of Naxos and Tinos and apostolic administrator of Chios
The archbishop of Athens and apostolic administrator of Rhodes
The bishop of Syros and Santorini and apostolic administrator of Crete
The exarch of the Greek Catholics of Byzantine Rite (based in Athens)
The ordinary of the Armenian Catholics (based in Athens)

Papal representatives to Greece

Organization

Roman Catholic 
Archdiocese of Athens
Archdiocese of Rhodos
Archdiocese of Corfù, Zante and Cefalonia
Archdiocese of Naxos, Andros, Tinos and Mykonos
Diocese of Chios
Diocese of Crete
Diocese of Santorini
Diocese of Syros and Milos
Apostolic Vicariate of Thessaloniki

Dioceses
Catholic Archdiocese of Corfu
Catholic Archdiocese of Rhodes
Catholic Archdiocese of Naxos - Tinos
Greek (Byzantine) Catholic  Exarchate

Parishes
Catholic parish of Heraklion
Catholic parish of Kavala
Catholic parish of Patras
Catholic parish of Thessaloniki
German-speaking Catholic community in Greece
Polish Catholic community in Greece

Others
Caritas Hellas
Jesuit Community in Greece

Notable Greek Roman Catholics
Demetrios Kydones, theologian
Ioannis Kyparissiotes, theologian
Thomas Palaiologos, Despot of Morea
Andreas Palaiologos, Despot of Morea
Basilius Bessarion, scholar, theologian and cardinal
Ioannis Argyropoulos, scholar
Ioannis Kottounios, scholar
Marcus Musurus, scholar
Francisco Leontaritis, composer
Vincenzos Cornaros, poet, playwright
Lorentzos Mavilis, poet and martyr
Ioannis Andreas Kargas, bishop of Syros
Dominikos Theotokopoulos ("El Greco"), painter
Constantine Gerachis (Phaulkon), adventurer
Ioannis Marangos, archbishop
Markos Vamvakaris, musician
Antonis Delatolas, publisher of To Pontiki
Maria Korinthiou, actress

Gallery

See also
Greek Byzantine Catholic Church
List of Greek popes
Religion in Greece

References

External links
Catholic Church in Greece

 
Greece